Aquarius conformis is a species of water strider in the family Gerridae. It is found in eastern North America from Quebec west to Wisconsin and south to Florida and Mexico.

Adults reach lengths of 15–16.5 mm. Aquarius conformis is part of the A. elongatus species group, being most closely related to A. nebularis, a species also found in eastern North America.

References

Further reading

 

Articles created by Qbugbot
Insects described in 1878
Gerrini